Robert James Elder, OC (born 27 July 1934) is a Canadian retired businessman and former equestrian. He competed at six Olympic Games between 1956 and 1984, winning one gold and one bronze medal. He missed the 1964 and 1980 Olympics because Canada did not send eventing and jumping teams there.

Biography
Born in Toronto, Ontario, Elder started competitive jumping at the age of 16 in 1950. During 36 years of competition, he won an Olympic gold medal, one Olympic bronze, five Pan American medals, and a world title. Elder was Canada's flag bearer at the closing ceremony of the 1972 Munich Olympics.

In 1983, he was honoured with the Order of Canada. He was inducted into the Canada's Sports Hall of Fame (1968), Canadian Olympic Hall of Fame (1971), Canada's Walk of Fame (2003), Canadian Eventing Hall of Fame (2009), and the Jump Canada (2010) Hall of Fame.

Elder graduated from the University of Toronto, where he was a member of the Delta Kappa Epsilon fraternity, and he later ran a successful refrigeration company. Since retiring, he has worked with Big Brothers and several other charity foundations, including the Community Association of Riding for the Disabled in Ontario and the Canadian Therapeutic Riding Association. He is also one of the co-founders of the Toronto Polo Club.

Elder's brother, Norman Elder, was an author and explorer. He was also an Olympic equestrian rider at the 1960 and 1968 Olympics. The brothers were on the same eventing teams at the 1959 Pan American Games and 1960 Olympics.

See also
 List of athletes with the most appearances at Olympic Games

References

1934 births
Living people
Animal sportspeople from Ontario
Canadian male equestrians
Equestrians at the 1956 Summer Olympics
Equestrians at the 1960 Summer Olympics
Equestrians at the 1968 Summer Olympics
Equestrians at the 1972 Summer Olympics
Equestrians at the 1976 Summer Olympics
Equestrians at the 1984 Summer Olympics
Event riders
Officers of the Order of Canada
Olympic bronze medalists for Canada
Olympic equestrians of Canada
Olympic gold medalists for Canada
Sportspeople from Toronto
Canadian show jumping riders
Olympic medalists in equestrian
Medalists at the 1956 Summer Olympics
Medalists at the 1968 Summer Olympics
Pan American Games medalists in equestrian
Pan American Games gold medalists for Canada
Pan American Games silver medalists for Canada
Pan American Games bronze medalists for Canada
Equestrians at the 1959 Pan American Games
Equestrians at the 1967 Pan American Games
Equestrians at the 1971 Pan American Games
Equestrians at the 1975 Pan American Games
Equestrians at the 1983 Pan American Games
Medalists at the 1983 Pan American Games